Anamaria Ocolișan (born 10 December 1997 in Petroșani, Romania) is a Romanian artistic gymnast. She was part of her country's team at the 2014 World Artistic Gymnastics Championships, competing in the team event where Romania placed fourth.

Senior career

2014 
Ocolisan competed at the National Championships where she placed 7th in the all-around, 3rd on vault and 3rd on the uneven bars. She also competed at a friendly meet between Switzerland, Germany and Romania where she placed 2nd with the Romanian team, 2nd on vault, 12th on the uneven bars and 8th on beam.

She was part of the Romanian team at the 2014 World Artistic Gymnastics Championships who placed 4th in the team final.

She also competed at the Joaquim Blume Memorial and placed 10th in the all-around.

2015 
Ocolisan competed at Trofeo Torino 4 Nazioni and placed 3rd with the team and 10th in the all-around.

In September she competed in a friendly meet between Romania and France and placed first with the team and second in the all-around behind Larisa Iordache. She also placed 1st on vault with 15.000 (tied with Larisa Iordache) and 3rd on uneven bars with 14.050.

Ocolisan was named to the Romanian team that would represent the country at the 2015 World Artistic Gymnastics Championships – in Glasgow, Scotland. However, an ankle injury during a training session at the event rendered her unable to participate in the competition.

Competitive history

References

External links 
 Profile at the International Federation of Gymnastics official website

1997 births
Living people
Romanian female artistic gymnasts
People from Petroșani
21st-century Romanian women